was a district located in Ōita Prefecture, Japan.

District Timeline
 July 22, 1878 - Nishikunisaki District was founded after Kunisaki District broke off into Nishikunisaki and Higashikunisaki Districts.
 April 1, 1889 - Prior to activating the town and village status, the district founded the towns of Takada and Tamazu and 17 villages
 April 1, 1907 - The towns of Takada and Tamazu, and the villages of Kinawa and Miwa were merged to create the town of Takada.
 January 1, 1919 - The village of Kadaki was elevated to town status.
 April 1, 1941 - The villages of Nishimatama and Nakamatama were merged to create the village of Matama.
 April 1, 1951 The town of Takada, and the villages of Kawachi, Higashitoko, Nishitoko and Kusaji were merged to create the town of Takada.
 March 31, 1954:
 The village of Kuresaki was merged into the town of Takada.
 The villages of Matama, Kamimatama and Usuno were merged to create the village of Matama.
 May 10, 1954 - The town of Takada was renamed as the town of Bungotakada.
 May 31, 1954 - The village of Tahashi was merged with the town of Bungotakada to create the city of Bungotakada.
 August 31, 1954 - The town of Kakadi, and the villages of Miura and Mie were merged to create the town of Kakaji.
 October 1, 1954 - The villages of Asada and Tahara were merged to create the village of Ōta
 January 1, 1955 - The village of Matama was elevated to town status.
 March 31, 2005 - The towns of Kakaji and Matama were merged into the expanded city of Bungotakada.
 October 1, 2005 - The village of Ōta, along with the town of Yamaga (from Hayami District), was merged into the expanded city of Kitsuki. Nishikunisaki District was dissolved as a result of this merger.

Former districts of Ōita Prefecture